Bele is a rural locality (a selo) in Chelushmanskoye Rural Settlement of Ulagansky District, the Altai Republic, Russia. The population was 30 as of 2016. There is 1 street.

Geography 
Bele is located on the right bank of the Lake Teletskoye in the valley of the Barchik creek, 125 km north of Ulagan (the district's administrative centre) by road. Kordon Atyshtu is the nearest rural locality.

Ethnicity 
The village is inhabited by Russians, Altai people and others.

References 

Rural localities in Ulagansky District